The Mathias Mitchell Public Square–Main Street Historic District is located in Stevens Point, Wisconsin. It was added to the National Register of Historic Places in 1986.

References

Geography of Portage County, Wisconsin
Historic districts on the National Register of Historic Places in Wisconsin
National Register of Historic Places in Portage County, Wisconsin